The Women is a 1936 American play, a comedy of manners by Clare Boothe Luce. The cast includes women only. 

The original Broadway production, directed by Robert B. Sinclair, opened on December 26, 1936, at the Ethel Barrymore Theatre, where it ran for 657 performances with an all-female cast that included Margalo Gillmore, Ilka Chase, Betty Lawford, Jessie Busley, Phyllis Povah, Marjorie Main, and Arlene Francis.

Synopsis
The play is a commentary on the pampered lives and power struggles of various wealthy Manhattan socialites and up-and-coming women and the gossip that propels and damages their relationships. While men frequently are the subject of their lively discussions and drive the action on-stage, they are never seen or heard.

Production
Following a premiere December 7, 1936, at the Forrest Theatre in Philadelphia, The Women opened December 26, 1936, at the Ethel Barrymore Theatre in New York City. Produced by Max Gordon, the  original Broadway theatre production was directed by Robert B. Sinclair with settings by Jo Mielziner and costumes by John Hambleton. 

The play was revived on Broadway in 1973 at the 46th Street Theatre, running April 25-June 17, with 63 performances. It was directed by Morton Da Costa, with scenic design by Oliver Smith, costume design by Ann Roth, and lighting design by John Gleason. Other supporting staff included: production stage manager Victor Straus; stage managers Nick Malekos and Suzanne Egan; costume supervisor Ray Diffen; press representatives Shirley Herz and Stuart Fink. 

A second revival opened November 8, 2001, at the American Airlines Theatre and closed January 13, 2002, after a 77 performances.  Production staff included: Director Scott Elliott, with assisting direction by Marie Masters; production stage manager Peter Hanson; stage manager Valerie A. Peterson; scenic designer Derek McLane; costume designer Isaac Mizrahi; lighting designer  Brian MacDevitt; and sound designer Douglas J. Cuomo. Jeff Francis did hair design, and  Gary Arave designed the wigs.

Cast

1936 Original Broadway 

Charita Bauer – Little Mary
 Eloise Bennett – Euphie
Eileen Burns – Miss Fordyce
Jessie Busley – Mrs. Morehead
 Mary Cecil – Maggie
Ilka Chase – Sylvia (Mrs. Howard Fowler)
 Virgilia Chew – Miss Watts
Audrey Christie – Miriam Aarons
 Beatrice Cole – Second Model
 Doris Day (not the movie star) – First Saleswoman
 Margaret Douglas – Countess de Lave
 Lucille Fenton – Head Saleswoman / A Nurse
Arlene Francis – Princess Tamara / Helene
Margalo Gillmore – Mary (Mrs. Stephen Haines)
 Ruth Hammond – Olga
 Joy Hathaway – A Fitter
 Anne Hunter – Exercise Intstrucetress
Ethel Jackson – Mrs. Wagstaff
Betty Lawford – Crystal Allen
Marjorie Main – Lucy
Adrienne Marden – Peggy (Mrs. John Day)
 Jane Moore – Second Hairdresser
 Mary Murray – Miss Trimmerback
 Lillian Norton – Cigarette Girl
Phyllis Povah – Edith (Mrs. Phelps Potter)
 Jean Rodney – Second Saleswoman
Jane Seymour – Nancy Blake
Mary Stuart – First Hairdresser
 Ann Teeman – Jane
 Martina Thomas – Third Saleswoman
Beryl Wallace – First Model
 Ann Watson – Pedicurist
Marjorie Wood – Sadie

1973 Revival 

Camila Ashland – Mrs. Wagstaff / Sadie
 Caryll Coan – Pedicurist / First Girl / Helene / Girl in Distress
Leora Dana – A Fitter / Miss Watts / Second Woman
 Jeanne DeBaer – Shirley / Princess Tamara / First Girl
Doris Dowling – A Nurse
Rhonda Fleming – Miriam Aaron
 Dorothy Loudon – Edith (Mrs. Phelps Potter)
Connie Forslund – Second Girl / Mat Girl/ Debutante
 Marian Hailey – Peggy (Mrs. John Day)
Kim Hunter – Mary (Mrs. Stephen Haines)
Bobo Lewis – Olga / Dowager
 Cynthia Lister – Little Mary
Myrna Loy – Mrs. Morehead
Jan Miner – Countess de Lage
 Elizabeth Perry – Customer / Miss Trimmerback / Second Girl / Third Model
 Regina Ress – Jane
Polly Rowles – Miss Curtis / Lucy
Louise Shaffer – Second Hairdresser / Second Model / Cigarette Girl
Alexis Smith – Sylvia (Mrs. Howard Fowler)
 Lynne Stuart – Mudmask / First Model
 Claudette Sutherland – First Hairdresser / Exercise Instructress / First Woman
Marie Wallace – Crystal Allen
Patricia Wheel – Miss Shapiro
Mary Louise Wilson – Nancy Blake

2001 Revival 

Lynn Collins – Miriam Aarons
Jennifer Coolidge – Edith (Mrs. Phelps Potter)
Hallie Kate Eisenberg – Little Mary
Lisa Emery – Nancy Blake
Kristen Johnston – Sylvia (Mrs. Howard Fowler)
Rue McClanahan – Countess de Lage
Cynthia Nixon – Mary (Mrs. Stephen Haines)
Amy Ryan – Peggy (Mrs. John Day)
Jennifer Tilly – Crystal Allen
Mary Louise Wilson – Mrs. Morehead
 Susan Bruce – Miss Watts / Second Saleswoman / Second Woman
 Jennifer Butt – Olga / A Fitter / First Girl
 Jane Cronin – Miss Fordyce
 Jen Davis – First Model
Mary Bond Davis – Maggie
Julie Halston – Lucy / Mudmask / First Saleswoman / First Woman
 Roxanna Hope – Princess Tamara / Second Hairdresser / Helene / Debutante
 Kelly Mares – Second Model
 Barbara Marineau – Mrs. Wagstaff / Second Salesgirl / Dowager
Heather Matarazzo – Jane
Adina Porter – A Nurse / Euphie / Miss Myrtle / Cigarette Girl
 Gayton Scott – Exercise Instructress / First Hairdress / Second Girl
Cheryl Stern – Miss Shapiro / Pedicurist / Sadie
 Ann Talman – Miss Trimmerback / First Salesgirl / Girl in Distress

Adaptations

Film
The 1939 film version was directed by George Cukor and starred Norma Shearer and Joan Crawford. Supporting cast included Rosalind Russell, Paulette Goddard, Joan Fontaine and Mary Boland.

In 1956, the story was made into a musical film titled The Opposite Sex, starring June Allyson and Joan Collins. 

Diane English co-wrote and directed the 2008 remake that was in development for 15 years. It starred Meg Ryan, Annette Bening, Eva Mendes, Debra Messing, Jada Pinkett Smith, Carrie Fisher, Cloris Leachman, Debi Mazar, Bette Midler, and Candice Bergen.

Television
On February 7, 1955, the NBC anthology drama series Producers' Showcase broadcast an adaptation of the play, starring Ruth Hussey as Mary. Paulette Goddard and Mary Boland, who had each appeared in the 1939 film, also appeared in this production, as Sylvia Fowler and the Countess, respectively. Shelley Winters played the part of Crystal Allen, while Mary Astor portrayed Nancy Blake and Bibi Osterwald was Edith Potter.

On June 18, 2002, the PBS anthology theatre series Stage on Screen broadcast a recording of the 2001 Broadway revival.

Awards and nominations

2001 Revival

References

External links
 
 
 
 Turner Classic Movies article on The Women
 "The Women" Past & Present @ LaFemmeReel.com

1936 plays
Broadway plays
Plays by Clare Boothe Luce
American plays adapted into films